Charles Wolf may refer to:

Charles Wolf (astronomer) (1827–1918), French astronomer
Charles Wolf (basketball) (born 1926), American basketball coach
Charles Wolf Jr. (1924–2016), senior economic advisor at the RAND Corporation
Charlie Wolf (born 1959),  British radio DJ

See also
Charles Wolfe (disambiguation)
Charles de Wolff (1932–2011), Dutch organist and conductor